Iridana ghanana, the Ghana sapphire gem, is a butterfly in the family Lycaenidae. It is found in Ghana and Cameroon. Its habitat consists of forests.

References

Butterflies described in 1964
Poritiinae